The ATP5MF gene encodes the ATP synthase subunit f, mitochondrial enzyme in humans.

Function 

Mitochondrial ATP synthase catalyzes ATP synthesis, utilizing an electrochemical gradient of protons across the inner membrane during oxidative phosphorylation. It is composed of two linked multi-subunit complexes: the soluble catalytic core, F1, and the membrane-spanning component, Fo, which comprises the proton channel. The catalytic portion of mitochondrial ATP synthase consists of 5 different subunits (alpha, beta, gamma, delta, and epsilon) assembled with a stoichiometry of 3 alpha, 3 beta, and single representatives of the gamma, delta, and epsilon subunits. The proton channel likely has nine subunits (a, b, c, d, e, f, g, F6 and 8). This gene encodes the f subunit of the Fo complex. Alternatively spliced transcript variants encoding different isoforms have been identified for this gene.

References

External links

Further reading